CEFCU ('sef-kyü) Stadium, formerly known as Spartan Stadium, is an outdoor athletic stadium on the west coast of the United States, located in the Spartan Keyes neighborhood of central San Jose, California. Owned by San José State University, the venue is the longtime home of Spartan football; it also hosts the university's commencement ceremony on Memorial Day weekend, and occasional high school football games. Known as Spartan Stadium for over eight decades, it was renamed in 2016.

CEFCU Stadium was the home of the San Jose Earthquakes (originally San Jose Clash) of Major League Soccer from the league's inception in 1996 through the 2005 season. Other tenants have included the original San Jose Earthquakes of the North American Soccer League from 1974 to 1984, the San Jose CyberRays of the Women's United Soccer Association from 2001 to 2003, and the San Francisco Dragons of Major League Lacrosse in 2008. Soccer Bowl '75 was also held at CEFCU.

During the winter and spring of 2009, the stadium's natural grass playing field was removed and replaced with FieldTurf, a new generation of artificial turf with a crumb rubber and sand infill. This improvement resulted in significant savings to the university in water use, fertilizer, seed and labor. The FieldTurf playing surface was later replaced with AstroTurf Rhino Blend in 2017.

The stadium also received significant upgrades to the scoreboard and sound system in 2011 and 2020. This included installation of an HD video screen by Daktronics at the south end of the stadium in 2011, and a new, much larger video board at the north end in 2020.

Stadium history

CEFCU stadium officially opened in 1933 as a 4,000-seat facility. The stadium featured large berms on the east, west, north and south sides of the field, which gave the stadium a "sunken bowl" appearance. The stadium's seating capacity was increased to 8,500 in 1936, and later expanded incrementally to a total seating capacity of just over 18,000 by 1948. The most recent additions came in the 1980s when the capacity of the stadium was expanded from approximately 18,000 to just over 31,000 by adding end zone bleachers, an upper deck and boxes on the west side.

In 1998, the field was widened and other renovations were carried out for the San Jose Earthquakes soccer team in accordance with official FIFA regulations. As a result of these renovations, parts of the stands closest to the playing field were removed, thus lowering available seating for all sports to 30,456. Seating capacity remained at 30,456 until 2019, when it was temporarily reduced to 21,520 as part of a massive east-side stadium renovation project. The project is scheduled to be completed in August 2023.

In August 2016, Citizens Equity First Credit Union purchased sole naming rights to Spartan Stadium for $8.7 million. The deal between CEFCU and San José State University will last for 15 years. SJSU was the first university in the California State University system and second university in the state of California to strike such a deal. The CEFCU sponsorship deal marked the third such arrangement among the 12 Mountain West Conference football members. The $8.7 million payout will primarily be used for athletic scholarships, athletics operations, and athletics facilities.

Spartan Athletics Center and East-side Renovations
A CEFCU Stadium east-side building addition is currently under construction at a projected cost of $57.6 million. Known as the Spartan Athletics Center, the 55,000 square-foot, multi-story facility will house a new football operations center, locker rooms, offices, meeting and training rooms and a sports medicine center. The facility will also include soccer team offices and locker rooms, as well as dining and hospitality facilities, event spaces and premium viewing areas. Along with construction of the SAC, a major renovation of the stadium's entire east side is currently underway.

The east-side stadium renovation has temporarily reduced seating capacity at CEFCU Stadium from just over 30,000 to 21,520. Approximately 9,000 seats were removed from the stadium in 2019 to make way for the new building. This includes virtually all of the east-side stadium seating and some of the north end zone bleachers. The north end zone bleachers were removed to make way for construction of a new state-of-the-art video scoreboard and outdoor bar and lounge area. The new scoreboard was completed in 2020. SAC construction and the east and north-side stadium renovations are projected to be completed in August 2023.

Other uses
The now defunct NCAA Silicon Valley Football Classic bowl game was held at CEFCU Stadium from 2000 to 2004.

CEFCU Stadium has hosted numerous FIFA events. Most notably the stadium was used as one of the venues for the 1999 Women's World Cup.

The stadium also hosts the commencement ceremonies of San José State University every spring, as well as musical concerts throughout the year. CEFCU Stadium is only one block from San Jose Municipal Stadium, home of the San Jose Giants, the Low-A minor league baseball affiliate of the San Francisco Giants.

International soccer matches

Gallery

See also
 List of NCAA Division I FBS football stadiums

References

External links

SJSU Spartans.com – official athletics site

College football venues
1999 FIFA Women's World Cup stadiums
San Jose State Spartans football
American football venues in California
Soccer venues in California
San Jose Earthquakes
Defunct NCAA bowl game venues
Former Major League Lacrosse venues
Former Major League Soccer stadiums
Sacramento Mountain Lions stadiums
Sports venues completed in 1933
Sports venues in San Jose, California
United Football League (2009–2012) venues
North American Soccer League (1968–1984) stadiums
1933 establishments in California